Little Mountain is a suburb of Caloundra in the Sunshine Coast Region, Queensland, Australia.

Geography 
Caloundra Road runs through from west to south-east.

History

Amenities 
The Sunshine Coast Regional Council operates a mobile library service which visits Karawatha Drive near the shopping centre.

Education 
There are no schools in Little Mountain. The nearest government primary schools are Meridan State College in neighbouring Meridan Plains to the north, Baringa State Primary School in neighbouring Baringa to the south, and Golden Beach State School in Golden Beach to the south-east. The nearest government secondary schools are Median State College and Caloundra State High School in Caloundra CBD.

References

Suburbs of the Sunshine Coast Region
Caloundra